Lee Ying-ping is a Taiwanese politician. She was the Political Deputy Minister of Culture in the Executive Yuan of the Republic of China from 2013 to 2015.

Education
Lee received her bachelor's degree in sociology from Soochow University.

See also
 Culture of Taiwan

References

1969 births
Living people
Soochow University (Taiwan) alumni
Taiwanese Ministers of Culture